Tipping Point Community is a grant-making organization aiming to break the cycle of poverty for people in the San Francisco Bay Area whose income level is too low to meet their basic needs. It was founded by Daniel Lurie in 2005.

In addition to general operating funding, Tipping Point provides grantees with "beyond dollars" support through strategic partnerships built with private sector corporations, who donate technology and services to these non-profit organizations.

In 2017, Tipping Point launched its first endeavor with the public sector, committing $100 million to cut chronic homelessness in San Francisco in half by 2022. This initiative, in partnership with the City and County of San Francisco, aims to create housing, improve public systems like criminal justice and child welfare to reduce the rate of homelessness, and help the city leverage more state and federal funding.

Tipping Point is modeled after the Robin Hood Foundation in New York, and has been praised as "an organization that aims to not only help the poor, but actively change the systems that put them there in the first place." In June 2017 "Tipping Point completed its largest fundraising year to-date, totaling $25 million in donor gifts, 100% of which will go out as grants by the end of the ensuing fiscal year in June 2018. Its board is composed of local philanthropists including Chris James, Katie Schwab Paige, Jed York and former San Francisco 49er Ronnie Lott. The board underwrites all fundraising and operating costs.

On November 16, 2019, Tipping Point Community announced that founder and CEO Lurie will step down after 15 years of leading the organization. Sam Cobbs, Tipping Point’s president, will succeed Lurie as CEO on January 6, 2020. Lurie will remain with Tipping Point as chair of the board.

Special Initiatives

 The Mental Health Initiative - Launched in 2008. In partnership with UCSF, Stanford University, and other experts in the field, Tipping Point grantees receive a combination of direct services from clinical staff and post-doctoral interns, agency-specific training, and consultation. Since the initiative's inception, more than 800 families have been referred to services through the Tipping Point Mental Health Initiative. In addition, Tipping Point offers about ten trainings every year for frontline and supervisory staff on a variety of mental health topics, including the impact of trauma on academic achievement, motivational interviewing, and self-care.
 Since 2013, Tipping Point has invested in research and development to fill gaps in the nonprofit sector and develop new poverty-fighting ideas. Known as T Lab, this R+D team exists to research, prototype, and test in partnership with Tipping Point grantees and the community at large.
 In October 2017, the Northern California Firestorm destroyed over 8,000 structures throughout Napa, Sonoma and Lake counties, displacing tens of thousands of people. Working with Bay Area enterprises including Salesforce, Twilio, San Francisco Giants, Another Planet Entertainment, and Live Nation, Tipping Point produced the Band Together Bay Area benefit concert. Featuring Metallica, Dead & Company, Dave Matthews and Tim Reynolds, G-Eazy, Raphael Saadiq and Rancid, the concert raised $17 million to support North Bay nonprofits serving low-income victims of the fires. As of January 2018, $32 million has been raised for the Tipping Point Emergency Relief Fund.

References

Community foundations based in the United States
Poverty-related organizations
Non-profit organizations based in San Francisco